Napoleone Boni (1863 in Massa Carrara – 1927 in Castelfiorentino, near Florence) was an Italian painter.

He first studied in the studio of Amos Cassioli in Florence, then worked in the Parisian studio of Carolus-Duran. He often painted subjects in oriental garb. In the 1887 National Exposition of Venice, he displayed an Odalisque. In 1889 in Florence, he exhibited Il Maglio. He also painted historical subjects such as Evangelista Torricelli invents the Barometer (Brera Academy, Milan).

References

1863 births
1927 deaths
People from Carrara
19th-century Italian painters
Italian male painters
20th-century Italian painters
Painters from Tuscany
19th-century Italian male artists
20th-century Italian male artists